The 2013 African U-17 Championship qualification was a men's under-17 football competition which decided the participating teams of the 2013 African U-17 Championship.

Preliminary round
The first leg matches were played on either 7, 8 or 9 September 2012. The second leg matches were played on either 21, 22 or 23 September 2012. The winners advanced to the First Round.

|}

First round

The first leg matches were played on either 12, 13 or 14 October 2012.  The second leg matches were played on either 26, 27 or 28 October 2012, except for the Congo vs Zimbabwe match, which was played on 6 November. The winners advanced to the Second Round.

|}

Second round

The first leg matches were played on either 16, 17 or 18 November 2012.  The second leg matches were played on either 31 November, 1 or 2 December 2012. The winners advanced to the Finals.

|}

Qualified teams
 
 
 
 
 
  (host nation)

References

External links
 2013 African U-17 Championship qualifiers
 2013 African Under-17 Championship qualifiers 1st-round
 2013 African Under-17 Championship qualifiers 2nd-round

Qual
Qual
2013